Corycium is a genus of terrestrial orchids comprising some 14 species in Eastern and Southern Africa including 10 species native to the fynbos. In South Africa they are called monkshood orchids.

Their resting stage is a tuber and when growing they have many leaves scattered along the stem but concentrated near the base. The dense spikes of flowers are not particularly striking and are often brown, green or purple. The uppermost 3 tepals are connivent into a hood whilst the lateral sepals are almost united. The lip is joined to the column bearing an appendage that covers the anthers

Species
Corycium alticola Parkman & Schelpe - South Africa, Lesotho
Corycium bicolorum (Thunb.) Sw. - South Africa
Corycium bifidum Sond. - South Africa
Corycium carnosum (Lindl.) Rolfe in W.H.Harvey - South Africa
Corycium crispum (Thunb.) Sw. - South Africa
Corycium deflexum (Bolus) Rolfe in W.H.Harvey  - South Africa
Corycium dracomontanum Parkman & Schelpe - South Africa, Lesotho, Swaziland, Malawi
Corycium excisum Lindl. - South Africa
Corycium flanaganii (Bolus) Kurzweil & H.P.Linder - South Africa, Lesotho
Corycium ingeanum E.G.H.Oliv. - South Africa
Corycium microglossum Lindl. - South Africa
Corycium nigrescens Sond. - South Africa, Lesotho, Swaziland, Tanzania
Corycium orobanchoides (L.f.) Sw. - South Africa
Corycium tricuspidatum Bolus - South Africa

References

  (1800) Kongl. Vetenskaps Academiens Nya Handlingar 21: 220.
  (2001) Orchidoideae (Part 1). Genera Orchidacearum 2: 23 ff. Oxford University Press.

External links

Coryciinae
Orchideae genera